James Palmer Pederson (October 19, 1907 – August 14, 1978) was an American football back who played three seasons in the National Football League with the Minneapolis Red Jackets, Frankford Yellow Jackets and Chicago Bears. He played college football and basketball at Augsburg College. He attended Willmar High School in Willmar, Minnesota. Pederson was the head football coach at Augsburg from 1933 to 1934, accumulating an overall record of 0–10. He was also the athletic director at Augsburg from April 1933 to May 1938, and the school's basketball coach from 1934 to 1936. He was inducted into the Augsburg Athletic Hall of Fame in 1973 and the Minnesota Football Coaches Association Hall of Fame in 1976.

See also
 List of college football coaches with 0 wins

References

External links
Just Sports Stats

1907 births
1978 deaths
American football running backs
American football defensive backs
Augsburg Auggies athletic directors
Augsburg Auggies football coaches
Augsburg Auggies football players
Augsburg Auggies men's basketball coaches
Augsburg Auggies men's basketball players
Basketball coaches from North Dakota
Basketball players from North Dakota
Chicago Bears players
Frankford Yellow Jackets players
Minneapolis Red Jackets players
People from Wells County, North Dakota
Players of American football from North Dakota
American men's basketball players